Rajdharma is a Sanskrit term for the "duty of the rulers".  This concept was intrinsically entwined with the concept of bravery and Kshatriya dharma.

In another interpretation, Rajdharma proceeds to guide the individual to incorporate spirituality in his/her work life and in his personal life. The thoughts do not focus on traditional or orthodox values and visions of religious duties, but on techniques by which one can become an effective competitor in the world market. Rajdharma was the obligation of kings. It guided the king in governing the state. It was similar to constitutional law and was "king of kings," shielding the subjects from the king's disaster and preventing him from becoming exploitative and tyrannous.

The spiritual dimension refers to the revival of inner strength, which is a sensitivity which can be felt and experienced but not measured. This prepares the individual to cope with the environmental scramble and existential stress. It also helps the individual to become a naturally happy person with no real gap between his public and private face. It is claimed that such persons become inspired workers and their inspiration is derived from spiritual strength and reinforced by positive thinking.

Footnotes

Hindu philosophical concepts
Indian words and phrases